Sparganothis cana, the gray sparganothis moth, is a species of moth of the family Tortricidae. It is found in North America, including Alabama, Arkansas, Florida, Kentucky, Louisiana, Manitoba, Maryland, Michigan, Mississippi, New Jersey, New York, North Carolina, Ontario, Quebec, Saskatchewan, South Carolina, Texas and Virginia.

The wingspan is about 18 mm.

References

Moths described in 1869
Sparganothis